It's What I'm Thinking Pt.1 – Photographing Snowflakes is the seventh studio album by Badly Drawn Boy, released on 4 October 2010.
The album was said to be heavily influenced by The Smiths.

Track listing
 "In Safe Hands" - 4:02
 "The Order of Things" - 5:14
 "Too Many Miracles" - 3:45
 "What Tomorrow Brings" - 3:44
 "I Saw You Walk Away" - 5:29
 "It's What I'm Thinking" - 6:27
 "You Lied" - 3:05
 "A Pure Accident" - 3:53
 "This Electric" - 4:18
 "This Beautiful Idea" - 4:42

References

2010 albums
Badly Drawn Boy albums